Shylock is a monologue in one 80-minute act written by Canadian playwright Mark Leiren-Young. It premiered at Bard on the Beach on August 5, 1996, where it was directed by John Juliani and starred popular Canadian radio host, David Berner. Its American debut was in 1998 at Philadelphia’s Walnut Street Theatre where it was directed by Deborah Block, starred William Leach and was “Barrymore Recommended.”  It has since been produced at theatres, Shakespeare Festivals and Fringes throughout Canada and the US (including the San Diego Repertory Theatre where it was staged opposite a controversial production of The Merchant of Venice), was translated for a production in Denmark and has been staged twice by the original actor, Berner, in Venice. A Czech translation by Jitka Sloupova ran in Prague from 2016-2019 at Divadlo Na Jezerce and starred Milan Kňažko.

The play focuses on a Jewish actor named Jon Davies, who is featured as Shylock in a production of Shakespeare’s The Merchant of Venice. Jon addresses his audience at a “talk back” session, after the play is closed abruptly due to controversy over the play’s alleged antisemitism. Davies is portrayed both in and out of character, presenting and stripping down the layers between character and actor.

Background
In the comedy The Merchant of Venice, the character of Shylock lends a fellow merchant money. The merchant’s ships sink, yet despite this loss, Shylock demands his money back. His defiant nature supposedly stems from a desire to avenge the unfair treatment of his Jewish people by Christians. Shylock is ultimately humiliated by the Christian court, his daughter disobeys him and marries out of race, and he is swindled out of his bond and forced to convert. At the time it was written, in 16th-century Venice, Jewish citizens were locked in the ghetto at nighttime and were forced to wear identifying hats during the day.

Plot
Actor Jon Davies asserts that Shakespeare intended the character of Shylock to be played as a villain in The Merchant of Venice based on the attitudes towards Jews during the era he was writing. His portrayal during past productions presented Shylock as a clown or tragic victim. His portrayal of the character as a villain causes drastic upset amongst audience members, a professor going so far as to spit at Davies. The professor, who is herself Jewish, disagrees with his views and calls him a “traitor to his race” after opening night, publishing a harsh review and organizing a boycott. Due to the uproar the play’s run gets cut short and a frustrated Davies is forced to confront his last audience. He comes out in full costume, make-up, and prosthetics, and strips off the character layer by layer as he speaks, until he stands before the audience to be judged as himself. Davies, a well-educated thespian, clarifies that Shylock was met with antagonism not because of outrage at his portrayal, but because of his recognized status as villain of the play. Davies argues that art and theatre should be provocative and challenging, regardless of potentially offensive or uncomfortable subjects.

Themes
The play addresses questions surrounding the diverse nature of art, the role and duties of the artist and the theatre in regards to audience reaction and critical response. Jon decides to play Shylock not as a victim, but as a villain, causing conflict due to his own Jewish heritage and his layered portrayal of Shylock’s character. Questions of historical revisionism, cultural manipulation, and political correctness lead to accusations of racism and of Jon as a “self-hating Jew”, forcing him to reassess his interpretation of the character as an actor, as well as his own persona. Shylock also examines the integrity of theatre at present through the lens of oversimplified Shakespearean translations, questioning the future of stage productions under the weight of censorship.

Responses
Shylock has received overwhelmingly positive critical and popular response, the script having been staged across Canada and the United States. The play has been continually praised by reviewers for directly confronting the controversy surrounding Antisemitism in The Merchant of Venice.  Writer Douglas J. Keating of the Inquirer Theatre Critic commends Leiren-Young for making “it clear what he thinks about the issues surrounding The Merchant of Venice while presenting “the controversy about its performance and censorship fully and fairly”. Its clutter-free set creates an intimate, relatable setting, while its dialogue is praised for adeptly engaging the audience with wit and humor. The Vancouver Courier calls the work “Dangerous, daring and provocative”. Michael Turner in Canada’s National Post deems Shylock “an effective piece of writing” garnering a “lively” and engaged response from audience members. In 1994, Shylock won Second Prize in Canada’s National One-Act Playwriting Competition.

References

1996 plays
Works based on The Merchant of Venice
Canadian plays
Plays for one performer